David Khvichayevich Khurtsidze (born 4 July 1993) is a Russian professional footballer who plays as a midfielder in Armenia for Urartu.

Club career
In June 2013 Khurtsidze moved on a yearlong loan to Zenit Penza. He made his debut in the Russian Second Division for FC Zenit Penza on 16 July 2013 in a game against FC Metallurg-Oskol Stary Oskol.

In February 2016, Khurtsidze signed a contract with FC Amkar Perm that began in the summer of 2016 (as he already played for two clubs in the 2015-16 season and was not eligible to be registered with Amkar in the winter).

In May 2017 Khurtsidze left Amkar Perm, signing for Torpedo Kutaisi in June of the same year.

On 26 June 2019, Khurtsidze was one of 13 players to sign for Ararat Yerevan. At the end of the 2020–21 season, Ararat Yerevan announced that Khurtsidze had left the club after his contract had expired.

On 30 August 2022, Khurtsidze left Alashkert after his contract was terminated by mutual consent, signing for Urartu on 9 September 2022.

Career statistics

Club

References

External links
 Career summary by sportbox.ru  
 
 

1993 births
Living people
People from Biysk
Russian footballers
Russia youth international footballers
Association football midfielders
Russian expatriate footballers
Expatriate footballers in Armenia
Russian expatriate sportspeople in Armenia
Expatriate footballers in Georgia (country)
Russian expatriate sportspeople in Georgia (country)
Ulisses FC players
FC Torpedo Kutaisi players
FC Armavir players
FC Amkar Perm players
Russian Premier League players
PFC CSKA Moscow players
FC Ararat Moscow players
FC Ararat Yerevan players
FC Alashkert players
Armenian Premier League players
Russian people of Georgian descent
Sportspeople from Altai Krai